Communist Party of Albania may refer to:

 Party of Labour of Albania (or Albanian Workers' Party), founded as the Communist Party of Albania
 Communist Party of Albania (1991)
 Communist Party of Albania 8 November
 Communist Reconstruction Party, in Albania
 Party of United Communists of Albania